The Junipero Serra Landfill was a solid waste disposal site in Colma, California, United States. The site was closed in 1983 and ultimately developed by commercial land uses, collectively known as the Metro Center. The site also required the engineering of a landfill gas control system, since, when organic solid waste aerobically decomposes, it produces methane gas, which is explosive and toxic in large concentrations. SCS Engineers was presented an award by the Solid Waste Association of North America for the design of the closure methane capture system at this landfill. (SCS Engineers, 2002).

The Junipero Serra Landfill is situated on the San Francisco Peninsula in the eastern foothills of the northwest trending Santa Cruz Mountain Range.  The foothills and eastern flanks of the range are composed largely of poorly consolidated Pliocene-Quaternary freshwater and shallow marine sediments that include the Colma and Merced Formations. (Earth Metrics, 1989) (Hart, 1985)  The Junipero Serra Landfill began operations in the year 1956 and accepted primarily commercial solid wastes.

See also
Landfill in the United States

References	

		
 Bay Area Rapid Transit District, Virtual art tour on the BART system, 2006
Earth Metrics Inc., Marc. Papineau, Ballard. George, Jill Buxton et al., Environmental Impact Report for the Metro Center, Colma, California,  Report  #10062, published by city of Colma  Planning Department and the California State Clearinghouse,  December, 1989 
Hart, E.W., Fault-Rupture Hazard Zones in California:  California Division of Mines and Geology, Special Publication #42 (1985)
SCS Engineers, Solid Waste Association of North America, 2002

Landfills in California
Geography of San Mateo County, California
History of San Mateo County, California
Former landfills in California
1956 establishments in California
1983 disestablishments in California